Agence des participations de l'État (APE, literally "State Participations Agency"), created in 2004 under the government of Jean-Pierre Raffarin, is the French agency responsible for managing the State's shareholdings in companies of strategic importance. As of 2021, APE has €685.3 billion worth of assets under management, which includes investments in companies involved in energy, industry, defence, transport, communication and finance, among others.

History
The State participation agency is a Service à compétence nationale (service with national competence) created in September 2004.
The creation of the Agency responded to the need to clarify the role of a shareholder of the State and the promotion of its patrimonial interests alongside the regulatory functions, tax collection, sectoral supervision, buyer that the State exercises.

This first step provided the State with a structure embodying and exclusively exercising its role as a shareholder. The second step was to endow the APE with greater autonomy. The appointment of a State Equity Commissioner, reporting directly to the French Ministry of the Economy and Finance, completed the process. Since May 2017, the APE has 88 companies  in its portfolio.

Since 2001, the activity of the State shareholder has been traced every year in a report appended to the draft Loi de finances en France (Finance law in France).

Operations 
The main operations carried out by the agency were:
 2003
 Merger of Air-France and KLM
 Transformation into public limited company of DCN in 2003, which became Naval Group in 2017
2004
 Transformation into a public limited company of France Telecom, in 2004, which became Orange in 2006
2005
 Merger between SNECMA and SAGEM which gave Safran
 Opening of the capital of EDF with nearly 5 million subscriptions from individuals
 Initial public offering of Gaz de France and its listing on CAC 40
 Transformation into a public limited company of ADP
2006
 Opening of the capital and the IPO of Aéroports de Paris in 2006 with 2.6M orders
 Disposal of Société des autoroutes du Nord et de l'Est de la France, Autoroutes Paris-Rhin-Rhône and Autoroutes du Sud de la France
2007
 Entry of Thales into the capital of DCN
2008
 Merger between Gaz de France and Suez to create the GDF-Suez group which became Engie in 2015
2010
 Merger of the two tunnel boring companies SFTRF and ATMB
 Transformation into a public limited company of La Poste
2012
 Recapitalization of Dexia
2013
 Takeover of the debt of the EPFR - Établissement public de financement et de restructuration (Public financing and restructuring institution) contracted vis-à-vis Crédit Lyonnais
 Creation of the Bpifrance (BPI)
2014
 Acquisition of a stake in PSA Peugeot Citroën
 Acquisition of a stake in Marseille Provence Airport
2015
 Restructuring of the nuclear sector started with EDF, Areva and Orano
 Restructuring of the land armaments sector with the merger of Nexter and KMW to form KNDS
2017
 Merger between Safran and Zodiac Aérospace
 Provisional nationalization of the Chantiers de l'Atlantique of Saint-Nazaire
2018
 Reform of the public broadcasting
 New Railway Pact
2019
 Privatization of La Française des Jeux

Goal 
The four missions of the Agency are as follows: Foster the economic performance of companies, their profitability and their long-term development; Act as a wise shareholder in corporate governance companies; Manage the portfolio of investments through acquisitions, disposals or shareholder mergers; Promote the exemplarity and social and environmental responsibility of companies.

The agency exercises the usual responsibilities of shareholders. In particular, the members of the agency represent the State on the boards of directors. The agency “ensures a sufficient level of control in companies operating in sectors that are particularly sensitive in terms of sovereignty”. It enforces political decisions in corporate governance, such as feminization, and executive compensation.

Since 2017, the Agency has revised its shareholder strategy. From now on, the State is intended to be a shareholder in three types of companies: strategic companies which contribute to sovereignty (defense and nuclear), companies participating in public service missions or of national or local general interest for which regulation would be insufficient to preserve public interests and ensure public service missions, companies in difficulty whose disappearance could lead to a systemic risk.

Direction 
The successive directors have been:
 Denis Samuel-Lajeunesse appointed general manager of the State participation agency on September 15, 2004
 Bruno Bézard appointed director general of the state participation agency on February 26, 2007
 Jean-Dominique Comolli appointed Commissioner for State Investments on September 15, 2010
 David Azéma appointed Commissioner for State Investments on September 1, 2012
 Régis Turrini appointed Commissioner for State Investments on September 1, 2014
 Martin Vial appointed Commissioner for State Investments on August 24, 2015.

For the performance of its missions, the APE has a tight team of 53 people, mostly civil servants. As of July 1, 2019, it had 27 senior executives and investment managers (General management and investment management) traditionally from engineering bodies (44%), but also, in order to diversify profiles, from other bodies. (30% civil administrators, 33% civil servants from other bodies - INSEE, Banque de France, IGF, Cour des comptes) or contract employees. Nearly 30% of the senior managers of the APE are also graduates of a major business school. The areas of expertise (financial, legal, audit and accounting and communication), support functions and secretariats employ 26 people.

List of firms
Resulting from historical stratification, the entities falling within the scope of APE represent both companies in various sectors (services and finance, energy, transport, industry) and multiple statutes – public limited companies in the majority of cases, but also public institutions of an industrial and commercial nature (établissements publics à caractère industriel et commercial - EPIC).

See also
 Bpifrance (company)
 Caisse des dépôts et consignations
 Établissement public à caractère industriel et commercial
 Government-owned corporation

References

External links
  

Economy of France
Government agencies of France
 Agence
France